Monocarboxylate transporter 3 (MCT3) also known as solute carrier family 16 member 8 is a protein that in humans is encoded by the SLC16A8 gene. MCT is a proton-coupled monocarboxylate transporter. It catalyzes the rapid transport across the plasma membrane of many monocarboxylates such as lactate, pyruvate, branched-chain oxo acids derived from leucine, valine and isoleucine, and the ketone bodies acetoacetate, beta-hydroxybutyrate and acetate. It also functions as high-affinity pyruvate transporter.

Expression of SLC16A8 is confined to the retinal pigment epithelium and choroid plexus epithelia, where it is located on the basal membrane in contrast to MCT1 which is found on the apical membrane.

See also 
 Monocarboxylate transporter

References

Further reading 

 
 
 
 
 

Solute carrier family